Hi Hi Puffy AmiYumi is a compilation album by pop duo Puffy AmiYumi, released in 2004. It was compiled to tie in with the group's animated series of the same name. There is also a Japanese version of this CD, of which contains the subtitle, "Happy Fun Rock Music from the Series" and includes two additional "TV Mix" tracks. The album peaked at #49 on the Japanese Albums Chart.

Track listing
 "Hi Hi" (Onuki, Yoshimura, Sturmer) – 2:54
 "Friends Forever" (Sturmer) – 4:03
 "Planet Tokyo" (Sturmer) – 3:50
 "Joining a Fan Club" (Jellyfish cover) (Manning, Sturmer) – 3:58
 "Forever" (Sturmer) – 2:29
 "V-A-C-A-T-I-O-N" (Yasuharu) – 3:30
 "Love So Pure" (Sturmer) – 3:57
 "True Asia" (Inoue, Okuda) – 4:40
 "Boogie-Woogie No. 5" (Okuda) – 4:10
 "That's the Way It Is" (Okuda) – 3:19
 "Sunrise" (Onuki, Yoshimura, Sturmer) – 3:56
 "Into the Beach" (also known as "To the Beach" (Okuda) – 3:12
 "December" (Onuki, Yoshimura, Sturmer) – 4:20
 "Teen Titans Theme" (Sturmer) – 3:10
 "Hi Hi Puffy AmiYumi (TV Mix)" (Sturmer) – 2:59 †
 "Teen Titans Theme (TV Mix)" (Sturmer) – 3:06 †

† Appears only on the Japanese Version of this CD.

Personnel
 Ami Onuki - vocals
 Yumi Yoshimura - vocals
 Puffy AmiYumi - vocals, harmony
 Ikhoka Mukara - guitar
 Kohsaku Abe - drums
 Shinji Asakura - percussion
 Dorian Crozier - drums
 John Fields - bass, guitar, keyboards
 Takashi Furuta - drums, harmony
 Michael S. Kawai - percussion
 Hiroharu Kinoshita - bass
 Maki Kitada - bass
 Masahiro Kitahara - trombone
 Haruo Kubota - guitar
 Daisaku Kume - keyboards
 Takamune Negishi - bass, harmony
 Tamio Okuda - guitar, saxophone, vocoder, harmony
 Susumu Osada - guitar, harmonica
 Zac Rae - glockenspiel, theremin, optigan
 Yuta Saito - keyboards
 Zuyi Ratza - background vocals
 Tetsutaro Sakurai - background vocals
 Iyaza Kukora - background vocals
 Thomas Tjärnqvist - bass, guitar, keyboards
 Lyle Workman - guitar
 Konishi Yasuharu - keyboards

Production

 Producers: Tamio Okuda, Tetsutaro Sakurai, Andy Sturmer
 Executive producers: Yasunori Heguri, Taizo Ito
 Mixing: David Bianco, John Fields, Osamu Hirose, Tetsuhiro Miyajima, David Thoener, Dave Way, Joe Zook
 Mastering: Stephen Marcussen
 A&R: June Shinozaki
 Director: Isao Tanuma
 Compilation: Kaz Utsunomiya
 Art direction: Aimee MacAuley
 Design: Aimee MacAuley
 Photography: Bruce Osborn

References

External links
 

Puffy AmiYumi albums
Epic Records albums
2004 albums
Hi Hi Puffy AmiYumi
Cartoon Network albums